Germanium monoxide, GeO, is a chemical compound of germanium and oxygen. It can be prepared as a yellow sublimate at 1000 °C by reacting GeO2 with Ge metal. The yellow sublimate turns brown on heating at 650 °C. GeO is not well characterised. It is amphoteric dissolving in acids to form germanium(II) salts and in alkali to form "trihydroxogermanates" or "germanites" containing the Ge(OH)3− ion.

Chemistry
Germanium oxide decomposes to Ge and GeO2.

See also
Germanium dioxide

References

Germanium(II) compounds
Oxides